Rabbit Run is a tributary of Doe Creek in Putnam County, Indiana in the United States.

Statistics
The Geographic Name Information System I.D. is 441709.

References

Rivers of Putnam County, Indiana
Rivers of Indiana